Chaglagam is a village and the headquarters of an eponymous circle in the Anjaw district in the north-eastern state of Arunachal Pradesh, India. It is on the bank of the Delei River.

The Chaglagam Circle contains the upper basin of the Delei River, on the border the Zayul County of China's Tibet Autonomous Region. It has a population of 1,681 people, distributed in 18 villages, as per the 2011 census.
The population consists of primarily Digaro Mishmi people.

Geography

Chaglagam is situated on the bank of the Delei River, which is a substantial tributary of the Lohit River. The Delei River rises below the Glei Pass
on the border with Tibet, and flows through the Chaglagam Circle along with its numerous tributaries (Duren, Kajap, Kazumiyo, Kalangmiyo etc.). It joins the Lohit River near Hayuliang.

Hayuliang is the nearest town to Chaglagam. It is also the headquarters of the Hayuliang Subdivision, which includes Chaglagam.

The Chaglagam Circle borders the Zayul County of the Tibet Autonomous Region of China. The people of Chaglagam traditionally participated in Indo-Tibetan trade between Assam and Zayul, acting as middlemen.
They travelled to Zayul via the Glei Pass, which is called Dri La by the Tibetans, leading to the village of Dri
in the western Zayul valley.
It was said to take 5 days march to Glei Pass from Rima in Tibet and another 20 days to reach Sadiya in Assam.
Another pass called Hadigra, to the west of Glei Pass, was also used, but less often.

To the northwest of the Chaglagam Circle is an anomalous jut-in of Tibetan territory called Fishtail-II, a relic of inadequate surveying in the 1914 McMahon Line map. The region is patrolled by both Indian and Chinese troops and occasional stand-offs are reported.

Chinese incursions
In August 2013, China's People's Liberation Army troops had intruded 20 to 30 km inside the Indian territory and stayed there for 4 days before being sent back by India's Indo-Tibetan Border Police (ITBF).

Transportation 
Chaglagam is located on the  proposed Mago-Thingbu to Vijaynagar Arunachal Pradesh Frontier Highway along the McMahon Line, alignment map of which can be seen here and here.

Demographics 
As per the 2011 Census of India, Chaglagam has 192 residents across 29 households. 155 are male, and 37 are female.

Notes

References

Bibliography

External links 
 Chaglagam Circle, OpenStreetMap, retrieved 2 December 2021.

Villages in Anjaw district
Borders of Arunachal Pradesh